Guarambaré is a town in the Central Department of Paraguay. Guarambaré was the name of a Guaraní tribe in North-Eastern Paraguay at the time of the founding of the Spanish colony during the 16th century. A Franciscan reduction was founded between 1580 and 1600 in the modern-day department of Concepción, south of the river Aquidabán. The reduction was relocated in 1673 to the current location, south-east of Asunción.

Sources 

World Gazeteer: Paraguay – World-Gazetteer.com

Populated places in the Central Department